Events from the year 1921 in Taiwan, Empire of Japan.

Incumbents

Central government of Japan
 Prime Minister: Hara Takashi, Takahashi Korekiyo

Taiwan
 Governor-General – Den Kenjirō

Events

October
 17 October – The founding of Taiwanese Cultural Association.

References

 
Years of the 20th century in Taiwan